Charles R. Holley Sr. (1924 - March 15, 1981) was a lawyer, state legislator, and Pinellas County circuit judge in Florida. He was the Republican candidate for governor in 1964. He represented Pinellas County in the Florida House of Representatives from 1960 to 1964 and served as minority leader during part of that time.

Holley was born in Jacksonville. He challenged the constitutionality of a Florida law requiring candidates for elected political office to not be serving in an elected office that would have an overlapping term with the new office if they won. The Florida Archives have a photo of him.

References

1924 births
1981 deaths
Republican Party members of the Florida House of Representatives